The Christ the King Church It is a Catholic church located in the city of Marks (Saratov) in Russia, home to the descendants of the  German Catholics of the Volga.

Christ the King Church is the first Catholic church to be built in Russia after the fall of the USSR, and even after the revolution of 1917. Construction began in 1990 and was consecrated in 1993.

The Catholic parish was registered, and rose from the ashes in 1983. Father Joseph Werth, he served this community as bishop since the late 1980s and the father Clemens Pickel until 2001, also as a bishop.

A community of Catholic nuns, is nearby. They provide, among other services catechesis.

The parish also serves the small village church of Stepnoïe 46 kilometers southwest.

See also
Roman Catholicism in Russia
Christ the King Church

References

German diaspora in Europe
Marks, Russia
Roman Catholic churches completed in 1993
 
20th-century Roman Catholic church buildings in Russia
Churches in Saratov Oblast